Lorenzo Crisetig (born 20 January 1993) is an Italian footballer who plays as a midfielder for Reggina.

Crisetig made his competitive debut on 27 September 2011, in the 2011–12 UEFA Champions League.

Club career

Youth career
Born in Cividale del Friuli, Crisetig started his career with local club Audace San Leonardo. In the next season he left for Donatello, located in the city of Udine. At age of 14 he was signed by Internazionale. Crisetig played for Giovanissimi Nazionali under-15 team In 2007–08 and Allievi Nazionali under-17 team in 2008–09 season. He was picked by Italy U-17 team in 2009 as one of the youngest players, which the team mainly consist of born 1992.

In August 2009 he played for the first team in a friendly match. Soon after, he received his first Italy U-21 team. That season he also promoted to the Primavera under-20 team. He also picked by José Mourinho in another friendly, mid of international break. In January 2010 he received his first competitive call-up, but did not play. Mourinho also made several call-up after that match. In May 2010 he also returned to Allievi Nazionali team, reached quarter-finals. He also won the experimental UEFA U18 Challenge against Bayern Munich U19 on 19 May, with Inter U19 (which 1990 born player of the Primavera did not play).

In the next season, he was named as one of the club youth product (List B) in 2010 UEFA Super Cup (but did not receive call-up). On 11 August, he made his Italy U-21 debut as the youngest player in history at the time. Under Rafael Benítez, he also received call-up to the first team; Benítez's successor, Leonardo, also picked Crisetig but he failed to make debut. Crisetig won 2011 Torneo di Viareggio with the Primavera.

Inter
Under new coach Gian Piero Gasperini, Crisetig played in pre-season friendlies. However, he did not play in competitive match. But under new coach Claudio Ranieri, he made his debut in 2011–12 UEFA Champions League on 27 September, replacing Cristian Chivu in the last minute. It was due to the injury crisis, in which the coach had five midfielders only (including Zanetti) plus Crisetig and youngster Andrea Romanò. He also played for the youth team in 2011–12 NextGen series in the next day.

Parma
On 23 January 2012, Inter bought back Joel Obi from co-owner Parma F.C. for €3.2 million. In the same deal, Crisetig, was sold to Parma in co-ownership deal for €1.5 million. Crisetig was remained in their "mother" club for the rest of the season. On 25 March 2012, he won the first edition of NextGen series with Primavera after penalty shootout win against AFC Ajax.

Spezia (loan)
During the summer 2012 Inter/Parma sent him on loan to Serie B club Spezia. He made his debut with Spezia on 10 August 2012 against Brescia replacing, in the 64th minute, Mirko Antenucci.

Crotone
During January 2013 Inter/Parma sent him on loan to Serie B club Crotone. In July 2013 the loan was extended.

Return to Inter
In June 2014 Inter bought back 50% registration rights of Crisetig for €4.75 million in a four-year contract, bought the remaining 50% registration rights of Yao Eloge Koffi for €1 million, as well as sold 50% registration rights of Ishak Belfodil back to Parma for €5.75 million.

Cagliari (loan)
On 11 July 2014, he was signed by Cagliari Calcio in a two-year loan, with an option to purchase.

Bologna
On 16 July 2015, Crisetig was signed by Bologna F.C. 1909. As part of the financial arrangement, Crisetig joined the club in a two-year loan, with an obligation to buy in 2017. On 31 August 2016, the last day of summer transfer window, his loan was terminated and he joined Bologna on permanent transfer the same day. According to Bologna, the transfer fee was €2.85 million, on top of €1 million loan fee for 2016–17 season; the loan fee of 2015–16 season was €500,000.

Crotone (loan)
After transfer deal with Inter was finalized, Crisetig was loaned to Crotone for one year on 31 August 2016.

Frosinone (loan)
On 10 July 2018, he was signed by Frosinone in a one-year loan, with an option to purchase.

Benevento (loan)
On 24 January 2019, Crisetig joined to Benevento on loan with an obligation to buy.

Mirandés
On 6 February 2020, Crisetig signed a short-term deal with CD Mirandés in the Spanish Segunda División. On 12 August, after just nine matches, he left the club.

Reggina
On 19 August 2020, he signed a 2-year contract with Reggina.

International career
Crisetig received his first call-up in December 2007, for the Christmas Youth Tournament. He made his debut in 2008, for Italy U-16 team. Despite not played in qualifying, he was picked by Pasquale Salerno to the final tournament of 2009 UEFA European Under-17 Football Championship, as the only born 1993 player. He started all four matches, losing to Germany in the semi-finals. In the 2009 FIFA U-17 World Cup, he played all five games, losing to Switzerland in the quarter-finals. He followed the team member promoted to U-18 team after the tournament. He was eligible to 2010 UEFA European Under-17 Football Championship, but did not play in any qualifying match.

The previous record holder was Federico Macheda. After that Crisetig went to U-19 team and made his U-19 debut on 22 September. Under the guidance of Daniele Zoratto, Crisetig played twice in 2011 U-19 Euro qualifying and two substitute appearances in the elite round, losing to Republic of Ireland in the last game. He also played twice for U-21 in friendlies in March, which coached by Ciro Ferrara.

After the U-19 team (made up of players born in and after 1992) was eliminated by the Irish, Crisetig remained in the U-19 team (but consists of players born in and before 1993) as one of the eldest players. He played 2 (out of possible 3) friendlies to prepare for the 2012 U-19 Euro qualifying which coached by Alberigo Evani. After made his professional debut, he joined the U-19 team on 29 September, but only played once out of three qualifying, being replaced by Francesco Vassallo for the latter. He started in the first match that losing to Romania 1–2 in the first qualifying match, on 6 October. Eventually Azzurrini qualified as the group 3 runner-up. That match also the last U19 match of Crisetig.

Crisetig played 4 times in 2012–13 Four Nations Tournament for Italy U20 plus two additional friendlies against Turkey U21  and Iran.

Crisetig was then part of Italian U21 squad for 2015 UEFA European Under-21 Championship.

Honours
Inter Milan Youth Sector
 UEFA Under-18 Challenge: 2010
 Torneo di Viareggio: 2011
 NextGen series: 2011–12

Footnotes

References

External links

 FIGC 
 
 
 

1993 births
Living people
People from Cividale del Friuli
Italian footballers
Italy youth international footballers
Italy under-21 international footballers
Association football midfielders
Serie A players
Serie B players
Inter Milan players
Spezia Calcio players
F.C. Crotone players
Cagliari Calcio players
Bologna F.C. 1909 players
Frosinone Calcio players
Benevento Calcio players
Segunda División players
CD Mirandés footballers
Reggina 1914 players
Italian expatriate footballers
Italian expatriate sportspeople in Spain
Expatriate footballers in Spain
Footballers from Friuli Venezia Giulia